Cummins Falls State Park is a  state park located northwest of Cookeville in Jackson County in the U.S. state of Tennessee. Its namesake, Cummins Falls, is a  waterfall, which is located on the Blackburn Fork State Scenic River. The park was purchased and created by the Tennessee Parks and Greenways Foundation in 2011.

Activities
Picnicking, hiking, and fishing may be done at Cummins Falls State Park.

See also
Burgess Falls State Park
Fall Creek Falls State Resort Park
Ozone Falls State Natural Area

References

External links
Official site

State parks of Tennessee
Protected areas of Jackson County, Tennessee
Waterfalls of Tennessee
Landforms of Jackson County, Tennessee